The Holocene calendar, also known as the Holocene Era or Human Era (HE), is a year numbering system that adds exactly 10,000 years to the currently dominant (AD/BC or CE/BCE) numbering scheme, placing its first year near the beginning of the Holocene geological epoch and the Neolithic Revolution, when humans shifted from a hunter-gatherer lifestyle to agriculture and fixed settlements. The current year by the Gregorian calendar, AD , is  HE in the Holocene calendar. The HE scheme was first proposed by Cesare Emiliani in 1993 (11993 HE), though similar proposals to start a new calendar at the same date had been put forward decades earlier.

Overview
Cesare Emiliani's proposal for a calendar reform sought to solve a number of alleged problems with the current Anno Domini era, which number the years of the commonly accepted world calendar. These issues include:
 The Anno Domini era is based on the erroneous and / or contentious estimates of the birth year of Jesus of Nazareth. The era places Jesus's birth year in AD 1, but modern scholars have determined that it's more likely that he was born in or before 4 BC. Emiliani argued that replacing the contested date with the approximate beginning of the Holocene makes more sense.
 The birth date of Jesus is a less universally relevant epoch event than the approximate beginning of the Holocene.
 The years BC/BCE are counted down when moving from past to future, making calculation of time spans difficult.
 The Anno Domini era has no year "zero", with 1 BC followed immediately by AD 1, complicating the calculation of timespans further. This is equally true of the Common Era, its non-religious equivalent.

Instead, HE uses the "beginning of human era" as its epoch, arbitrarily defined as 10,000 BC and denoted year 1 HE, so that AD 1 matches 10,001 HE.
This is a rough approximation of the start of the current geologic epoch, the Holocene (the name means entirely recent). The motivation for this is that human civilization (e.g. the first settlements, agriculture, etc.) is believed to have arisen within this time. Emiliani later proposed that the start of the Holocene should be fixed at the same date as the beginning of his proposed era.

Benefits
Human Era proponents claim that it makes for easier geological, archaeological, dendrochronological, anthropological and historical dating, as well as that it bases its epoch on an event more universally relevant than the birth of Jesus. All key dates in human history can then be listed using a simple increasing date scale with smaller dates always occurring before larger dates. Another gain is that the Holocene Era starts before the other calendar eras, so it could be useful for the comparison and conversion of dates from different calendars.

Accuracy
When Emiliani discussed the calendar in a follow-up article in 1994, he mentioned that there was no agreement on the date of the start of the Holocene epoch, with estimates at the time ranging between 12,700 and 10,970 years BP. Since then, scientists have improved their understanding of the Holocene on the evidence of ice cores and can now more accurately date its beginning. A consensus view was formally adopted by the IUGS in 2013, placing its start at 11,700 years before 2000 (9701 BC), about 300 years more recent than the epoch of the Holocene calendar.

Equivalent proposals 
In 1924 Gabriel Deville proposed the use of Calendrier nouveau de chronologie ancienne (CNCA), which would start 10,000 years before AD 1, which is identical to Emiliani's much later proposal.

Since 1929, Dievturi, adherents of Latvian religion Dievturība, use Latviskā ēra (Latvian Era) which begins at the same point; this coincides with the first inhabitants’ influx to the territory of present Latvia (10500–10047 BCE). According to Latvian Era, ¹2023 is written for 2023 CE. Detailed explanation of Latvian Era by Ernests Brastiņš was first published in 1934.

In 1963 E.R. Hope proposed the use of Anterior Epoch (AE), which also begins at the same point.

Conversion
Conversion from Julian or Gregorian calendar years to the Human Era can be achieved by adding 10,000 to the AD/CE year. The present year, can be transformed into a Holocene year by adding the digit "1" before it, making it  HE. Years BC/BCE are converted by subtracting the BC/BCE year number from 10,001.

See also
 After the Development of Agriculture – calendar system that adds 8000 years to the Common Era.
 Anno Lucis – calendar system that adds 4000 years to the Common Era.
 Before Present, the notation most widely used today in scientific literature for dates in prehistory.
 Calendar reform

References

Further reading
 
 
 

1993 in science
1993 introductions
10th millennium BC
Archaeological terminology
Calendar eras
Geochronology
Holocene
Proposed calendars
Jōmon period
Specific calendars